Thebarton, formerly Theberton, on Kaurna land, is an inner-western suburb of Adelaide, South Australia in the City of West Torrens. The suburb is bounded by the River Torrens to the north, Port Road and Bonython Park to the east, Kintore Street to the south, and South Road to the west.

Many buildings and landmarks that bear the name of Thebarton were in the history municipality, the Town of Thebarton, which included most of the adjoining suburb of Torrensville. These include the Thebarton Oval, the Thebarton croquet and bowls club, Thebarton Theatre, and Thebarton Senior College. The historic Adelaide Gaol, nominally shown as being in Thebarton, and the adjacent Thebarton Barracks of the South Australia Police actually lie within the northwestern Adelaide Park Lands. A part of Thebarton adjacent to the River Torrens, later the site of the South Australian Brewing Company, was originally known as Southwark. Hemmington, Hemmington West and West Thebarton were also suburbs later incorporated into current-day Thebarton.

History
Prior to European settlement of South Australia, the areas now known as Thebarton and Hindmarsh were called Karraundongga (meaning "red gum spear place") by the Kaurna people, who would craft spears from the red gum branches gathered on the banks of the Torrens there.

The suburb of Thebarton was named after the home of Colonel William Light, the first Surveyor-General of the colony of South Australia, where he lived with his de facto wife Maria Gandy and her brothers. Light named his home after Theberton Hall of Suffolk, England, where he was educated.  The area was known as Theberton until approximately 1840, with the variant spelling now accredited to a typographical error, rather than a corruption of "The Barton", based on the Old English bere-tun, meaning "barley farm", as was thought for some time.

Colonel Light surveyed the town-acre as Section 1 and built Theberton Cottage towards the northern part of the area. The area was first subdivided for housing in February 1839, although it took a number of years for the housing to establish, Thebarton Post Office opening on 24 October 1850. By 1866 the population was estimated at around 450 people.

Thebarton Racecourse, which operated from as early as 1838 to 1869, was formed on grazing land in the area now known as Mile End, and later subdivided and completely built over.

The Torrenside Brewery, next to the Torrens on Port Road, was founded in 1886 by A. W. & T. L. Ware, in the then suburb of Southwark. After acquisition by the Walkerville Co-operative Brewing Company Ltd, and its subsequent acquisition by the South Australian Brewing Company in 1939, it was renamed from Walkerville Brewery to Southwark Brewery in 1949 and the company's Walkerville Nathan beer was renamed Southwark beer in 1951. The brewery closed on 17 June 2021, with its landmark chimney tower heritage-listed, to be preserved when the site is redeveloped. The artefacts in its on-site museum are being donated to the State Library of South Australia and other local institutions.

Local government
Thebarton was part of the then largely rural District of West Torrens until 1883, when the residents of the more urban suburbs of Thebarton, Mile End and Torrensville successfully petitioned to become the Corporation of the Town of Thebarton.

In 1997 the Town of Thebarton re-amalgamated with the City of West Torrens.

Demographics

Thebarton has a significant Greek-Australian population and is the suburb with the largest Greek Australian population per capita in Australia. In fact, according to census data released by the Australian Bureau of Statistics in 2001, the suburbs of Thebarton and neighbouring Torrensville together are home to 4,471 Greek-Australians; i.e., 18.7 per cent of the total population.

Facilities
The Thebarton campus of the University of Adelaide, also known as Adelaide University Research Park, occupies a complex of former industrial buildings in the northeastern corner of the suburb.

Landmarks
 St George Greek Orthodox Church on Rose Street, Adelaide's largest Greek Orthodox church
 The Ice Arena, home of the Adelaide Adrenalines, who play in the Australian Ice Hockey League
 Thebarton Oval, former home of the West Torrens Football Club in the South Australian National Football League; now home to the Adelaide Footy League.
 The Thebarton Incinerator on West Thebarton Road was designed by Walter Burley Griffin in 1935, completed in 1937, and decommissioned in 1964. It is one of two Burley Griffin buildings listed among the 120 nationally significant 20th-century buildings in South Australia, the other being the Hindmarsh Incinerator at Brompton.
 The West End Brewery at 107 Port Road (closed June 2021).
The well-known Thebarton Theatre is actually in the neighbouring suburb of Torrensville.
The Adelaide Gaol is easterly-adjacent to Thebarton in the western Adelaide parklands.
A rectangular memorial on the corner of Albert and Maria Streets, dedicated to Maria Gandy, William Light's partner, was unveiled on the 200th anniversary of her birth on 23 November 2011. On each of four sides is an inscription celebrating her roles as pioneer, settler, carer and mother.

Heritage listings
Thebarton has a number of heritage-listed sites, including:

 39A Dew Street: Lady Gowrie Child Centre
 1 George Street: Squatters Arms Hotel
 42 and 42A Phillips Street: Thebarton Baptist Church and Hall
 77 Port Road: Southwark Hotel (pronounced  )

 107 Port Road, site of the West End Brewery: 
Plaque only – Site of Colonel Light's Cottage (13 December 2001)
Remains of `Theberton Hall' Colonel William Light's House (including Underground Room, Underground Tank and Well) (provisionally added 20 May 2021)
Walkerville Brewhouse Tower, built 1886, enlarged 1898–1899, doubled in size 1901–1903,   one of a few remaining and one of the largest examples of a brewhouse tower in South Australia (provisionally added 20 May 2021)
 Electric Supply Company Transformer (13 December 2001)
 35-37 Stirling Street: Faulding's Eucalyptus Oil Distillery
 34-36 West Thebarton Road: Thebarton Incinerator

References

Further reading

Suburbs of Adelaide